The Al Mahdi Mosque is an Ahmadi Muslim mosque in Bradford, England. The mosque was built at a cost £2.5 million entirely from voluntary donations of British Ahmadi Muslims. The mosque was opened on 7 November 2008 by Mirza Masroor Ahmad, the current and fifth caliph of Ahmadiyya Muslim Community. With a capacity of 2,000 worshippers, it is among the largest in the city. The inauguration was attended by many Ahmadi Muslims and over 300 guests. The mosque, on Rees Way, was built at the top of a hill  and is visible from miles around within the city.

In 2014, the mosque was the host of BBC Radio 4's topical debate programme Any Questions?.

See also
 Islam in England
 List of mosques in the United Kingdom

References

Further reading

2008 establishments in England
Mosques in England
Ahmadiyya mosques in the United Kingdom
Religious buildings and structures in West Yorkshire
Buildings and structures in Bradford
Mosques completed in 2008
Mosque buildings with domes